Major-General Gunning Morehead Campbell,  (6 January 1863 – 29 November 1920) was a Royal Marines officer who served as Adjutant-General Royal Marines.

Military career
Educated at Wellington College and the Royal Naval College, Greenwich, Campbell was commissioned into the Royal Marine Artillery on 1 September 1880. He took part in the Nile Expedition in 1884 and served as Inspector of Recruiting during the First World War. He went on to be Adjutant-General Royal Marines in July 1920 but died in office in November 1920. He was buried in Portsmouth (Highland Road) Cemetery.

References

1863 births
1920 deaths
Companions of the Order of the Bath
Royal Marines generals
Royal Marines generals of World War I
Royal Navy personnel of the Mahdist War
Burials in Hampshire